The Hongkong and Shanghai Hotels, Limited (HSH) is the holding company of a hotel group. It is engaged in the ownership, development and management of The Peninsula Hotels; commercial and residential properties in Asia, the United States and Europe; and the provision of tourism and leisure, club management and other services. Sir Michael Kadoorie owns 47% of the shares of HSH.

The Peninsula Hotels 
The Peninsula Hotels portfolio comprises The Peninsula Hong Kong, The Peninsula Shanghai, The Peninsula Beijing, The Peninsula Tokyo, The Peninsula New York, The Peninsula Chicago, The Peninsula Beverly Hills, The Peninsula Bangkok, The Peninsula Manila and The Peninsula Paris. Projects under development include The Peninsula London and The Peninsula Istanbul.

Property portfolio 
The property portfolio of the group includes The Repulse Bay Complex, The Peak Tower, The Peak Tram and St. John's Building in Hong Kong; The Landmark in Ho Chi Minh City, Vietnam; and 21 avenue Kléber in Paris, France.

The major shareholders in HSH are members of the Kadoorie family.

History
The company was incorporated in 1866 as The Hongkong Hotel Company Limited, owner of the Hong Kong Hotel (opened in 1868). The company owned by the Jewish Kadoorie family in the 1890s, it merged with the Shanghai Hotel in 1922 and used the current name of Hong Kong and Shanghai Hotel in the following year.
It was one of the first companies in Hong Kong to be listed on the Stock Exchange of Hong Kong. In 2007, the Hong Kong Heritage Project was set up to archive historical materials from HSH, CLP Holdings and the Kadoorie family. The publicly accessible archive provides audio, visual and documentary evidence of HSH's activities through the 19th and 20th centuries.

Kadoorie Chairmen 
The Kadoorie family have been Chairmen since 1937, when Sir Elly Kadoorie was first appointed to the post. The following lists out the subsequent list of Kadoorie Chairmen since.

 Sir Elly Kadoorie (1937–1942)
 Lawrence Kadoorie, Baron Kadoorie (1945–1950)
 Sir Horace Kadoorie (1950–1985)
 Sir Michael Kadoorie (1985– )

Hotels 
Asia
 The Peninsula Hong Kong - 1928
 The Peninsula Manila - 1976
 The Peninsula Beijing - 1989
 The Peninsula Bangkok - 1998
 The Peninsula Tokyo - 2007
 The Peninsula Shanghai - 2009
North America
 The Peninsula New York - 1988
 The Peninsula Beverly Hills - 1991
 The Peninsula Chicago - 2001
Europe
 The Peninsula Paris - 2014

Future
 The Peninsula Istanbul (2023)
 The Peninsula London (2022)

Other properties 
 Peak Tower, Hong Kong
 Peak Tram, Hong Kong
 The Repulse Bay, Hong Kong
 St. John's Building, Hong Kong
Quail Lodge Golf Club, Carmel, California

Former hotels
 Hong Kong Hotel - Hong Kong
 The Palace Hotel - Shanghai
 Astor House Hotel - Shanghai

References

External links 
 

Hospitality companies of Hong Kong
Hospitality companies established in 1866
Companies listed on the Hong Kong Stock Exchange
1866 establishments in Hong Kong